The men's high jump was one of six jumping events on the athletics at the 1908 Summer Olympics programme in London. The competition was held on Tuesday, July 21, 1908.  Twenty-two high jumpers from ten nations competed. NOCs could enter up to 12 athletes. The event was won by Harry Porter of the United States, the nation's fourth consecutive victory in the men's high jump. There was a three-way tie for silver (a jump-off was held, but was unable to resolve the tie).

Background

This was the fourth appearance of the event, which is one of 12 athletics events to have been held at every Summer Olympics. No jumpers from the 1904 Games returned. The favorite was Irish jumper Con Leahy, the four-time (1905–1908) AAA champion who had also won the 1907 AAU title and the 1906 Intercalated Games. American Harry Porter, the 1908 AAU champion, was also highly regarded.

Belgium, Canada, Finland, and the Netherlands each made their debut in the event. The United States appeared for the fourth time, having competed at each edition of the Olympic men's high jump to that point.

Competition format

There were two rounds of jumping, though the results from the qualifying round carried over to the final. The top eight jumpers in the qualifying round advanced to the final. Each competitor received three attempts at each height. The judges determined the initial height of the bar and any increases. There was a jump-off of the tie for second, but details are unknown. "Diving" and "somersaulting" were not allowed.

Records

These were the standing world and Olympic records (in metres) prior to the 1908 Summer Olympics.

(*) unofficial

Harry Porter equalized the standing Olympic record with 1.90 metres.

Schedule

Results

After the first of four qualifying groups finished, officials determined that the ground conditions were unsuitable and chose a different location for the remaining three groups. Herbert Gidney protested, resulting in a repeat of the first group. Gidney benefited, improving his height from 1.77 metres in the now-invalidated initial round to 1.85 metres in the re-jump. He displaced as finalists Otto Monsen, who had initially jumped 1.79 metres but refused to participate in the re-jump, and Edward Leader, whose initial 1.79 metres was replaced by the inferior 1.77 metres he achieved in the re-jump.

There was a jump-off for second place after three men jumped 1.88 metres but could not match Porter's 1.90 metres, but none of the three jumpers were able to jump 1.88 metres again and were declared joint silver medalists.

Porter, after winning, attempted the world record height of 1.97 metres; his three attempts at that height were all unsuccessful.

References

Sources
 Official Report of the Games of the IV Olympiad (1908).
 De Wael, Herman. Herman's Full Olympians: "Athletics 1908". Accessed 31 March 2006.

Athletics at the 1908 Summer Olympics
High jump at the Olympics